The Camp Desert Center was a sub camp of the US Army, Desert Training Center in Riverside County, California. The main headquarters for the Desert Training Center was Camp Young, this is where General Patton's 3rd Armored Division was stationed. Camp Desert Center was at Desert Center, California, in Riverside County, California in the Colorado Desert. It is in southern California, between the cities of Indio and Blythe at the junction of Interstate 10 and State Route 177, about halfway between Phoenix and Los Angeles. The Camp Desert Center was location just south of Joshua Tree National Park near the Colorado River Aqueduct. Camp Granite was designated a California Historic Landmark (No.985). The site of Camp Desert Center became the small town of Desert Center, California. Army Divisions were not stationed at Camp Desert Center, the camp was used as a supply depot, maintain repair depot and an evacuation hospital run by the 92nd medical unit.

Camp Desert Center was built in April 1942. The Desert Training Center was built to prepare troops to do battle in North Africa to fight the Germans during World War II. When completed the camp had shower buildings, latrines, evacuation hospital, weather station (Type D), wooden tent frames, Ammo depot, Quartermaster store, water storage tanks and water treatment plant. The 18th Ordnance Battalion operated out of the camp. The camp was closed on 16 December 1944 and the US Army constructions was removed.

92nd Army medical unit
The 92nd Evacuation Hospital at Camp Desert Center was a 300-bed hospital. The Evacuation Hospital was in operation from May 1943 to December 1943 at Camp Desert Center. The 92nd medical unit had medical doctors, nurses and surgery room. Treating troop suffering from desert dehydration to emergence surgery. Before arriving at Camp Desert Center the 92nd medical unit was stationed at the Camp Freda Hospital at the Camp Freda Quartermaster Depot. The 92nd medical unit used did not move out to the North African campaign like most of the thousands of troops that trained in the desert camps. The 92nd medical unit after the desert training was transferred to went on to fight in the South Pacific theatre of war. First action was the New Guinea campaign, Battle of Luzon and Battle of Leyte. At the end of the war the 92nd was part of the occupation of Japan.

Desert Center Army Air Field 

The US Army Desert Center Army Air Field, also called Desert Center Airdrome was built in 1942 with two 5,500' runways, near the Camp Desert Center. The 74th Reconnaissance Group was the first to use the Air Field, later the 377th Service Squadron, 475th Base Headquarters and 1111th Guard Squadron. Over 40 buildings were built at the Army Air Field to support the training at the many desert camps. After the war it was renamed Desert Center Airport (CN64). Desert Center Army Air Field was built about 5 miles northeast of Camp Desert Center. The Camp Desert Airfield air landing strip was used to support the camp reconnaissance activities and the evacuation hospital. In 1943 the 475th Base Headquarters & Air Base Squadron was headquartered here. Stationed at the Desert Center Army Air Field were: Curtiss O-52 Owl, Stinson L-1 Vigilant, Piper L-4, North American B-25 Mitchell, Bell P-39 Airacobra and Curtiss P-40 Warhawk. When the Camp Desert Center closed in 1944, the airfield was turned over to the Fourth Air Force who rarely used it; only occasional B-24 Liberator training flights from March Field landed at Camp Desert Airfield. The at the end of military use the Camp Desert Airfield was turned over to the Army Corps of Engineers; later it was sold for private-use. The Desert Center Airport is now a private-use airport.

External links
Training Center Boogie - Sony by John Malcolm Penn, song about : Desert training camps

See also
 Camp Hyder 
 Camp Bouse 
 Camp Coxcomb
California during World War II

References

Military in Riverside County, California
Military installations in California
Closed training facilities of the United States Army
History of Riverside County, California
California in World War II
Formerly Used Defense Sites in California
California Historical Landmarks
1942 establishments in California
1944 disestablishments